Gǎnqíng literally means "feel" (Gǎn, 感) "affection" (Qíng, 情) and together the term is often translated as "feelings" or "emotional attachment". Gǎnqíng refers to a friendship-like feeling that develops between two people, groups, or business partners as their relationship deepens. Gǎnqíng is an important concept in social relations in Chinese culture that has roots in Confucianism, and is a sub-dimension to the concept of guānxi (a person's relationship network). Developing good gǎnqíng is a critical aspect of building guānxi relationships. Good gǎnqíng means that two people have developed a rapport, while deep gǎnqíng means there is a considerable emotional bond within the relationship. Gǎnqíng can also refer as "love affair" in Chinese.

The term gǎnqíng is often used in comments by the government of the People's Republic of China, for example statements that an action "hurts the feelings of the Chinese people" which some people interpret to mean harm the relationship with the Chinese government.

References

Chinese culture
Chinese words and phrases
Interpersonal relationships